Joseph Hollingsworth could refer to: 

Joe E. Hollingsworth (1908–1975), Los Angeles City Council member
Joe Hollingsworth (1925-1975) American football player
J. Rogers Hollingsworth (Joseph Rogers Hollingsworth, 1932-2019) American historian and sociologist
Trey Hollingsworth (Joseph Albert Hollingsworth III, born 1983), American businessman and politician